The Maleeva sisters refers to three professional tennis playing siblings from Bulgaria. They managed to be ranked among the top ten on the WTA singles world ranking; and are the only three sisters ever to reach the top ten.

Manuela Maleeva (born 1967)
Katerina Maleeva (born 1969)
Magdalena Maleeva (born 1975)

See also
Yuliya Berberyan-Maleeva, mother and one-time coach of the Maleeva sisters.

 
Sibling trios